Cleanse may refer to:

 Cleanse (Joywave album), a 2022 album by Joywave
The Cleanse, a 2016 American film directed by Bobby Miller
"Cleanse", a song by Neurosis from their 1993 album Enemy of the Sun
An alternative medicine approach that proponents claim rids the body of toxins; see

See also
Cleanliness, the state of being clean and free from dirt
Cleansing (disambiguation), the process of making something clean and pure